One human poll comprised the 1942 National Collegiate Athletic Association (NCAA) football rankings. Unlike most sports, college football's governing body, the NCAA, does not bestow a national championship, instead that title is bestowed by one or more different polling agencies. There are two main weekly polls that begin in the preseason—the AP Poll and the Coaches' Poll. The Coaches' Poll began operation in 1950; in addition, the AP Poll did not begin conducting preseason polls until that same year.

Legend

AP Poll
The final AP Poll was released on November 30, at the end of the 1942 regular season, weeks before the major bowls. The AP would not release a post-bowl season final poll regularly until 1968.

AP Service Poll
On December 2, a special panel of 91 sportswriters for the Associated Press released a ranking of the US service academy football teams, as they had not been permitted in the regular 1942 AP poll (this practice would be reversed in 1943).  The Great Lakes Naval Training Station football team was awarded service champion, garnering the most overall (812) and 1st place votes (50) in the special poll.  The ranking system was ten points to the first place team, nine for 2nd place, and so on, with the sportswriters ranking their top ten.  Teams that did not finish in the overall top ten but still received individual votes were also added to the final standings.

 In parenthesis is the number of 1st place votes

References

College football rankings